Ann Cleeves  (born 1954) is a British mystery crime writer. She wrote the Vera Stanhope, Jimmy Perez, and Matthew Venn series, all three of which have been adapted into TV shows. In 2006 she won the Duncan Lawrie Dagger for her novel Raven Black, the first novel in the Jimmy Perez series.

Early life and career

Cleeves was born in Herefordshire and brought up in north Devon where she attended Barnstaple Grammar School; she studied English at the University of Sussex but dropped out and then took up various jobs including cook at the Fair Isle bird observatory, auxiliary coastguard, probation officer, library outreach worker and child care officer.

Personal life

She lives in Whitley Bay, and is widowed with two daughters.

Honours, awards, and media appearances

In 2006 she won the Duncan Lawrie Dagger for her novel Raven Black. In 2014 Cleeves was awarded an Honorary Doctorate of Letters by the University of Sunderland. In 2015, Cleeves was the Programming Chair for the Theakstons Old Peculier Crime Writing Festival & the Theakston's Old Peculier Crime Novel of the Year Award. In 2015, she was shortlisted for the Dagger in the Library UK Crime Writers' Association award for an author's body of work in British libraries (UK). 

Cleeves was chosen as the 2017 recipient of the Cartier Diamond Dagger from the Crime Writers' Association for "sustained excellence" in crime fiction. In February 2019 Ann Cleeves appeared on Desert Island Discs. Cleeves was appointed Officer of the Order of the British Empire (OBE) in the 2022 New Year Honours for services to reading and libraries.

In July 2022, Cleeves was awarded an honorary D.Litt. from Newcastle University for services to reading and libraries.

Bibliography

Palmer-Jones
 A Bird in the Hand (1986), 
 Come Death and High Water (1987), 
 Murder in Paradise (1988), 
 A Prey to Murder (1989), 
 Another Man's Poison (1992), 
 Sea fever (1993), 
 The Mill on the Shore (1994), 
 High Island Blues (1996),

Inspector Ramsay
 A Lesson in Dying (1990), 
 Murder in My Backyard (1991), 
 A Day in the Death of Dorothea Cassidy (1992), 
 Killjoy (1993), 
 The Healers (1995), 
 The Baby Snatcher (1997),

Vera Stanhope
These novels, except for The Glass Room, have been dramatized in the television series Vera on ITV, which stars Brenda Blethyn in the title role.  The programme premiered in May 2011.
 The Crow Trap (1999), 
 Telling Tales (2005), 
 Hidden Depths (2007), 
 Silent Voices (2011), 
 The Glass Room (2012), 
 Harbour Street (2014), 
 The Moth Catcher (2015), 
 The Seagull (2017), 
 The Darkest Evening (2020), 
 The Rising Tide (2022),

Shetland
In 2013, Red Bones was dramatised by David Kane for BBC television as the first episode of the series Shetland, which stars Douglas Henshall as Detective Inspector Jimmy Perez. Episodes broadcast in 2014 were based on Raven Black, Dead Water, and Blue Lightning.
The Four Seasons Quartet
 Raven Black (2006), ; Gold Dagger Award
 White Nights (2008), 
 Red Bones (2009), 
 Blue Lightning (2010), 
The Four Elements Quartet
 Dead Water (2013), 
 Thin Air (2014), 
 Cold Earth (2016), 
 Wild Fire (2018), 

A Shetland Island series travel tie-in preceding the below released Too Good To Be True.
 Shetland (2015), 

A Shetland Island series novella following the above non-fiction Shetland and  preceding Cold Earth.
 Too Good To Be True (2016), ; novella

Two Rivers
The first book is the adaptive basis for The Long Call ITV series starring  Ben Aldridge as DI Matthew Venn.
 The Long Call (2019), 
 The Heron's Cry (2021),

Standalone novels
 The Sleeping and the Dead (2001), 
 Burial of Ghosts (2003),

TV series adaptations
The Vera Stanhope novels have been dramatised as the TV detective series Vera beginning 2011; the Jimmy Perez novels as the TV series Shetland; and the Matthew Venn novel The Long Call (from Cleeves' Two Rivers book series) as the TV series The Long Call (premiered autumn 2021).

References

External links
 Ann Cleeves: biography
 Ann Cleeves Interview with WritersNewsWeekly.com
 Interview on Keeper of the Snails
 Harbour Street : Review
 Story behind Harbour Street - Online essay by Ann Cleeves 
 When a young archaeologist discovers a set of human remains, the locals are intrigued - Online Book Store

1954 births
Living people
English crime fiction writers
Members of the Detection Club
20th-century English novelists
Crime Writers' Association
21st-century English novelists
20th-century English women writers
21st-century English women writers
English women novelists
Women mystery writers
Place of birth missing (living people)
People from Herefordshire
People from North Devon (district)
People educated at Barnstaple Grammar School
Date of birth missing (living people)
Officers of the Order of the British Empire
Cartier Diamond Dagger winners